Most of the walled villages of Hong Kong are located in the New Territories.

History
During the Ming and Qing dynasties, the shore of Guangdong suffered from pirates, and the area of present-day Hong Kong was particularly vulnerable to pirates' attacks. Winding shores, hilly lands and islands and remoteness from administrative centres made the territory of Hong Kong an excellent hideout for pirates. Villages, both Punti and Hakka, built walls against them. Some villages even protected themselves with cannons. Over time, the walls of most walled villages have been partly or totally demolished.

Names
In Punti Cantonese, Wai (Walled) and Tsuen (Village) were once synonyms, hence most place names which include the word 'wai', were at some point in time a walled village.

Conservation
Two heritage trails of Hong Kong feature walled villages:
 Ping Shan Heritage Trail. One walled village: Sheung Cheung Wai.
 Lung Yeuk Tau Heritage Trail. Five walled villages: Lo Wai, Ma Wat Wai, San Wai (also called Kun Lung Wai ), Tung Kok Wai (also known as Ling Kok Wai), Wing Ning Wai.

Features
Walled villages in Hong Kong are characterised by row houses arranged in a square or rectangular block, where the parallel rows of houses are separated by narrow lanes.

Notable walled villages

Kat Hing Wai

Kat Hing Wai is a noted Punti walled village in Yuen Long District of Hong Kong. It often mistakenly believed to be Hakka, whose people have similar traditions. However the Punti people were from Southern China and the first to settle in Hong Kong. Kat Hing Wai's residents speak Cantonese, rather than Hakka. Popularly known as Kam Tin, from the name of the area, it is home to about 400 descendants of the Tang Clan, who built the village back in the 17th century.

Kat Hing Wai is a rectangular (100 m x 90 m) walled village. As a family stronghold, Kat Hing Wai has served the Tangs well through the centuries, protecting the residents against bandits, rival clans, and wild tigers. During the Qing dynasty, a five-metre high blue brick wall and four cannon towers were added to defend against bandits. Today, the village is still completely surrounded by 18-inch-thick walls, outside which are the remains of a moat. However, most houses within the walls have been rebuilt in recent years.  There is only one narrow entrance, with a pair of iron gates.

Tsang Tai Uk

Tsang Tai Uk, also known as Shan Ha Wai, is another well-known Hakka walled village in Hong Kong, and one of the best preserved. It is located in Sha Tin, close to the south of the Pok Hong Estate, not far from the Lion Rock Tunnel Road. Built as a stronghold for the Tsang Clan, its construction started in 1847 and took around 20 years to complete. The village is built with granite, grey bricks, and solid timber.

Sheung Shui Wai

Sheung Shui Wai, also known as Sheung Shui Heung, is one of the very few rural settlements having retained its original moat which was built in 1646. Characterized by its magnificent moat and landscape setting, the walled village is the core of the Liu clan, of which ancestors came originally from Fujian during the Yuan dynasty (1271–1368). The village is located in Sheung Shui.

Fanling Wai

Fanling Wai is a walled village in Fanling built by the Pang Clan. It is recognisable with the distinctive pond and layout including features such as cannons and watchtowers. All these elements were crafted to form an integral part of the village setting. Fanling Wai is the centre of the Pang Clan who arrived in Hong Kong late during the Song dynasty.

Nga Tsin Wai Tsuen

Nga Tsin Wai Tsuen is a walled village in Wong Tai Sin, New Kowloon. It is the only walled village left in the urban built-up areas of Hong Kong. Nga Tsin Wai Tsuen is also the only remaining walled village in Kowloon. It is located near San Po Kong. On 18 July 2007, the government announced its plans to redevelop Nga Tsin Wai Tsuen.

List of walled villages
Remaining walled villages in Hong Kong include:

North District

Sha Tin District

Tai Po District

Tsuen Wan District

Tuen Mun District

Wong Tai Sin District

Yuen Long District

Unconfirmed
The following villages are likely to have been walled villages, although it is not confirmed:

Other fenced villages
A number of old villages in Hong Kong have a wall, built for defensive or feng shui purposes, and an entrance gate, but are not considered as traditional walled villages. They include:

Non-walled 'wai'
The following villages are neither current nor former walled villages, despite the wai in their name:

 Fan Ling Nam Wai
 Fan Ling Pak Wai
 Fung Ka Wai
 Ha Wai
 Hok Tau Wai
 Kam Tsin Wai
 Kan Tau Wai
 Kat O Sheung Wai
 Kau Lung Hang Kau Wai
 Kau Lung Hang San Wai
 Kau Shi Wai, renamed Fung Mei Wai
 Kei Ling Ha San Wai
 Kei Lun Wai
 Lo Wai (Tsuen Wan)
 Luk Keng Ha Wai
 Luk Keng Sheung Wai
 Mai Po Lo Wai
 Nam Pin Wai (Sai Kung)
 Nam Wai
 Pak Wai (Kam Tin)
 Pak Wai (Sai Kung)
 Pui O Lo Wai
 San Lung Wai
 San Tin Ha San Wai
 San Tin Sheung San Wai
 Sha Lo Tung Lo Wai
 Sha Tin Wai
 Shek Pok Wai
 Shek Tau Wai
 Sheung Kwai Chung Wai
 Shui Tsiu Lo Wai
 So Kwun Wat Lo Wai
 Tai Po Kau Lo Wai
 Tai Po Kau San Wai
 Tai Shang Wai
 Tap Mun Chung Wai
 Tap Mun Ha Wai
 Tap Mun Sheung Wai
 To Yuen Wai
 Tseng Tau Wai
 Tsing Chuen Wai (Yuen Long)
 Tsiu Keng Lo Wai
 Tsiu Keng San Wai
 Tung Chan Wai
 Tung Tau Wai
 Wong Chuk Hang San Wai 
 Wong Ka Wai
 Wu Kau Tang Lo Wai

See also

 Housing in Hong Kong
 History of Hong Kong
 List of villages in Hong Kong
 Chinese clan
 Weitou dialect
 Dapengcheng, a walled village in Shenzhen
 Hakka walled village
 Kowloon Walled City

References

Further reading

 
 
 Wang, Weijen, "Axial Inversion – the transformation of the spatial structure and its ritual axis in Hong Kong's walled villages" Hong Kong Papers in Design and Development, Vol.1, pp. 26–33, Dec. 1998
 

 
Culture of Hong Kong
Hakka architecture